"The Gilded Cage" is the seventh episode of the third series of the 1960s cult British spy-fi television series The Avengers, starring Patrick Macnee and Honor Blackman. It was first broadcast by ABC on 9 November 1963. The episode was directed by Bill Bain and written by Roger Marshall.

Plot
Steed and Cathy set out to snare criminal mastermind John P. Spagge using a gold bullion robbery as bait. Postal cards and a gas figure prominently.

Cast
 Patrick Macnee as John Steed
 Honor Blackman as Cathy Gale 
 Patrick Magee as John P. Spagge
 Edric Connor as Abe Benham
 Norman Chappell as Fleming
 Margo Cunningham as Wardress
 Fredric Abbott as Manley
 Alan Haywood as Westwood
 Martin Friend as Hammond
 Terence Soall as Peterson
 Geoff L'Cise as Gruber
 Douglas Cummings as Fatso Barker
 Neil Wilson as Groves

References

External links

Episode overview on The Avengers Forever! website

The Avengers (season 3) episodes
1963 British television episodes